Quartier du Roi  is a quartier of Saint Barthélemy in the Caribbean. It is located in the northwestern part of the island.

The local timezone is called America/St Barthelemy with a UTC offset of about -4 hours. 

Populated places in Saint Barthélemy
Quartiers of Saint Barthélemy